The following roads are numbered 237:

Canada
 Manitoba Provincial Road 237
 Newfoundland and Labrador Route 237
 Prince Edward Island Route 237
 Quebec Route 237

Costa Rica
 National Route 237

Ireland
 R237 regional road

Japan
 Japan National Route 237

United States
 Alabama State Route 237
 California State Route 237
 Florida State Road 237 (former)
 Georgia State Route 237
 Indiana State Road 237
 K-237 (Kansas highway)
 Kentucky Route 237
 Maine State Route 237
 Maryland Route 237
 Minnesota State Highway 237
 New Mexico State Road 237
 New York State Route 237
 Ohio State Route 237
 Oregon Route 237
 Pennsylvania Route 237 (former)
 Tennessee State Route 237
 Texas State Highway 237
 Texas State Highway Loop 237 (former)
 Texas State Highway Spur 237 (former)
 Texas Farm to Market Road 237
 Utah State Route 237 (former)
 Virginia State Route 237
 Washington State Route 237 (former)
 Wyoming Highway 237